Elizabeth Jackson Drake (born 1975) is a Washington, D.C. attorney in private practice and is a former nominee to be a United States Judge of the United States Court of International Trade.

Biography 

Drake received a Bachelor of Arts degree in 1996 from the University of California at Berkeley. She received a Juris Doctor in 1999 from Harvard Law School. From 1999 to 2005, she served as an international policy analyst at the American Federation of Labor and Congress of Industrial Organizations (AFL–CIO), where she advocated for workers’ rights in trade and international economic policies. In addition, she has served on the Labor Advisory Committee on Trade Policy and Negotiations to the United States Trade Representative. She is currently a partner in the law firm of Schagrin Associates, where her practice focuses on international trade law matters and where she advises clients on disputes before the World Trade Organization. In addition to practicing before the United States Court of International Trade, she also practices before the United States Department of Commerce, the United States International Trade Commission and the United States Court of Appeals for the Federal Circuit.

Expired nomination to trade court 

On July 30, 2015, President Obama nominated Drake to serve as a United States Judge of the United States Court of International Trade, to the seat vacated by Judge Richard K. Eaton, who took senior status on August 22, 2014.

She received a hearing on her nomination on January 27, 2016. On April 7, 2016, her nomination was reported out of committee by voice vote. Her nomination expired on January 3, 2017, with the end of the 114th Congress.

References 

1975 births
Living people
20th-century American lawyers
20th-century American women lawyers
21st-century American lawyers
21st-century American women lawyers
Harvard Law School alumni
Lawyers from Washington, D.C.
People from Champaign, Illinois
University of California, Berkeley alumni